Tommaso Caputo (born 17 October 1950) is an Italian prelate of the Catholic Church who worked in the diplomatic service of the Holy See from 1980 to 2012, when he was named Territorial Prelate of Pompei.

Biography
Tommaso Caputo was born on 17 October 1950 in Afragola in Naples, Italy. He studied at the seminary in Naples and obtained a licenciate in sacred theology at the Theological Faculty of Southern Italy. He was ordained a priest on 10 April 1974. His early assignments including the formation of seminarians, parish vicar, and religion teacher in the public schools.

To prepare for a diplomatic career he entered the Pontifical Ecclesiastical Academy in 1976. While there, he also earned a doctorate in canon law at the Pontifical Lateran University. Caputo joined the diplomatic service of the Holy See on 25 March 1980 where he occupied various posts at the Apostolic Nunciatures in Rwanda (1980–1984), the Philippines (1984–1987), Venezuela (1987–1989), and at the Secretariat of State (1989–1993). On 19 June 1993 he was named Head of Protocol in the Secretariat of State.

Caputo was appointed Titular Archbishop of Otriculum and Apostolic Nuncio to Malta and Libya on 3 September 2007. He was ordained a bishop by Pope Benedict XVI (principal consecrator), and the Cardinals Tarcisio Bertone and Marian Jaworski, on 29 September 2007. In March 2011, as the political situation in Libya was becoming violent, he appealed for Italy to accept Eritrean refugees trapped in Libya. He reported that Catholic religious in the country were not in danger as "the Libyan people, as traditionally they have always done, are expressing their gratitude for the presence and service of the women religious and priests. In these days this benevolence is shown with concrete gestures of solidarity".

He held his post as Nuncio until his appointment as prelate of the Territorial Prelature of Pompei on 10 November 2012. Pope Francis approved his additional appointment to the office of Assessor of the Order of the Holy Sepulchre effective September 2019.

References

Additional sources

External links

Catholic-Hierarchy 

Clergy from Naples
Apostolic Nuncios to Malta
Apostolic Nuncios to Libya
21st-century Italian Roman Catholic titular archbishops
1950 births
Living people
Pontifical Ecclesiastical Academy alumni
Pontifical Lateran University alumni
Diplomats from Naples